Hangout with Yoo is a South Korean reality/variety show 
broadcast by MBC TV. It premiered on July 27, 2019, and airs on Saturdays at 18:30 (KST).

Synopsis
This is a show that was started in order to find out what Yoo Jae-suk would be doing during his days off. Subsequently, the show showcases Yoo (and currently, with six new fixed cast members) taking on various projects, with him taking on various secondary roles.

Segments
(Only segments that last at least three episodes will be listed here)

 Throwaway Entertainment:

Camera Relay: PD Kim Tae-ho will first pass the camera to Yoo and from there the camera relay continues by passing to the next celebrity until the camera's storage is full. Different celebrities will be using the camera to record what they will be doing during their days off.
Yoo-plash: Yoo, as Yoo-go Starr, learns to play the drums. He is taught to play a drum beat, and this beat sample he played would then be spread out to various singer-songwriters and producers to further work on it, adding accompaniment by accompaniment as the relay goes on until a complete song is produced. This segment showcases the producing of numerous songs, which began from the drum sample, and eventually the drum recital where Yoo performs the songs together with the artists involved.
Bbong For Yoo: Yoo debuts as a trot singer under the stage name Yoo San-seul (유산슬). This segment showcases all the activities he had taken part as a rookie trot singer.
Life Ramyeon: Yoo, as YooRaSek, handles a ramyeon restaurant, serving ramyeon that he cooked to celebrities, while sharing heart-to-heart talks.
Indoor Concert: Yoo, as Yoo Sam, goes to recruit various acts and then host an indoor concert, without any audience. This project was initiated at the last minute due to the current 2020 coronavirus pandemic in South Korea.
Chicken Doctor Yoo: Yoo, as Chicken Doctor Yoo, makes Korean fried chicken, the reason being many shops selling it have been shutting down due to the current 2020 coronavirus pandemic in South Korea. A continuation of this project, named Saturday Saturday Chicken, was done, as Yoo and several celebrities work together to operate a fried chicken drive-through for only 100 cars.
Summer X Dance X Yoo Jae-suk (later named SSAK3): Yoo, taking the stage name U-Doragon, forms a co-ed trio SSAK3 (싹쓰리) with Lee Hyo-ri and Rain, and the trio made their debut on July 25, 2020. This project was done due to ballads dominating the music charts even in the summer, which PD Kim Tae-ho thought to be not the usual as the past, when upbeat dance songs (typically by co-ed groups) were popular in the season.
Refund Sisters: Yoo, as Jimmy Yoo, becomes the producer of the special 4-member girl group Refund Sisters (환불 원정대), who made their debut on October 10. This is a spin-off from Lee Hyo-ri naming Uhm Jung-hwa, Jessi and Hwasa (Mamamoo) as the members she want in her dream girl group during the SSAK3 segment.
H&H Corporation: H&H stands for "Heart & Heart". Yoo, as Yoo Pang, together with Kim Jong-min and Defconn, picks several stories from people who want to show their hearts, but find it difficult to speak out, to their intended recipients. He then contacts, either through video call or visiting personally, and deliver these stories in place of the senders to these intended recipients.
Winter Songs Resurrection Plan: Yoo plans to find songs with the feeling of winter, and invite artists to recreate performances of the songs live for the special. The reason is that for some reasons, in this winter season, songs with the winter feeling could not be heard in the streets of Korea.
Variety Investor (later named 2021 Live And Fall Together): Yoo, as Canola Yoo, finds celebrities who have potential to become variety stars, together with Kim Jong-min and Defconn. Eventually, the program "Live And Fall Together", which was hosted by Yoo, returns after 20 years.
MSG Wannabe: Yoo, as Yoo Yaho (who is the twin brother of Jimmy Yoo), finds potential members among male celebrities to produce the male vocal group MSG Wannabe, which is a name parody of vocal trio SG Wannabe. Eventually, the final MSG Wannabe lineup consists of 8 members, and two sub-units are also formed: M.O.M (Jee Seok-jin, KCM, Wonstein, Parc Jae-jung) and JSDK (Kim Jung-min, Simon Dominic, Lee Dong-hwi, Lee Sang-yi).
Hangout With Yoo+: Jeong Jun-ha, Haha, Lee Mi-joo and Shin Bong-sun appear as semi-fixed cast members to join Yoo in taking on newer projects. The quartet have subsequently become fixed cast members of the show beginning episode 124.
Acorn Festival: Yoo, Haha and Mijoo formed a project trio Toyote (토요태), a parody of Koyote, after the trio's cover of Freestyle's "Y" received huge responses. The festival focuses on songs that charted very well on Cyworld BGM Chart, and their singers.
WSG Wannabe: Yoo, as Yoo Pal-bong (who is a distant relative of Jimmy Yoo and Yoo Yaho), finds potential members among female celebrities to produce the female vocal group WSG Wannabe, which would be the female counterpart of MSG Wannabe. Eventually, the final WSG Wannabe lineup consists of 12 members, and three sub-units are also formed: Gaya-G (Lee Bo-ram, Soyeon (Laboum), Hynn, Jung Ji-so; under Antenna's Yoo Pal-bong and Yoo Mijoo), Sa-Fire (Navi, Sole, Eom Ji-yoon, Kwon Jin-ah; under QuanMujin's Big Ul & Hip Ul), and Oasiso (Yoon Eun-hye, Kota (Sunny Hill), Park Jin-joo, Jo Hyun-ah (Urban Zakapa); under SiSo's Elena Kim & Shin Mina).
JMT: Yoo is a director at JMT (Joy & Music Technology) after leaving Infinite Company. This segment is known as the continuation of Infinite Company, which is an unscripted skit that parodied on the lives of office employees, and was one of the more well-known segments of Infinite Challenge.

History 
On January 12, 2022, MBC announced PD Kim Tae-ho will resign on January 17, 2022. He left MBC after 21 years of ending with 'Acorn Festival' aired on January 15, 2022. PD Park Chang-hoon, who directed Omniscient Interfering View, was selected as Kim Tae-ho's successor.

Philanthropy 
On December 28, 2022, the show will donate 1.79 billion won from broadcasting in 2022 to 14 organizations in need.

List of episodes

Discography

Yoo-plash
This album was released as a compilation of all the artists who participated in the making of Yoo-plash segment.

Bbong for Yoo
These songs were released through the Bbong for Yoo segment.

Indoor Concert
This song was released through the Indoor Concert segment.

SSAK3 and Refund Sisters
These songs were released through the SSAK3 and Refund Sisters segments.

MSG Wannabe
These songs were released through the MSG Wannabe segment.

Hangout with Yoo+ (Acorn Festival)
This song was released through the Hangout with Yoo+ (Acorn Festival) segment.

WSG Wannabe
These songs were released through the WSG Wannabe segment.

Ratings 
 Ratings listed below are the individual corner ratings of Hangout with Yoo. (Note: Individual corner ratings do not include commercial time, which regular ratings include.)

2019

2020

2021

2022

2023

Awards and nominations

Notes

References

External links
  
 Official YouTube Channel 

MBC TV original programming
South Korean variety television shows
South Korean television shows
2020s South Korean television series
2019 South Korean television series debuts
Korean-language television shows
South Korean reality television series